St. Paul Elementary School can refer to:

St. Paul Elementary School (Kentucky) in the Archdiocese of Louisville, Kentucky
St. Paul Elementary School (Quebec) in Beaconsfield, Quebec
St. Paul Elementary School (Toronto) in Toronto, Ontario
St. Paul Elementary School (Virginia) in St. Paul, Virginia